= AffrontTheater =

Austrian theatre group

Coordinates: 47.77080°N 13.05639°E

AffrontTheater is a theatre group active in Salzburg, Austria.
